Lino Grech (1930 – 2 December 2013) was a Maltese actor, writer and director.

Born in Sliema, Grech was noted for his role on the television drama F'Bahar Wiehed (1970s), the first Maltese-language television series, which broadcast on TVM.

Lino Grech died on the night of 1 December 2013, aged 83, at the Mater Dei Hospital in Msida. His funeral mass took place in his hometown of Sliema on 4 December. He was survived by his wife, Frances, and their children.

Filmography

References

External links

1930 births
2013 deaths
People from Sliema
Maltese film directors
Maltese male film actors
Maltese male television actors
Maltese male stage actors
Maltese male writers